Karl Viljo Halme (24 January 1907 – 21 October 1981) was a Finnish football goalkeeper. He earned 30 caps for the Finland national football team and was a member of the Finland squad at the 1936 Summer Olympics. Halme is considered one of the all-time best goalkeepers of Finland.

Career 
Halme started his career in the Helsinki working class side Jyry, playing in the Finnish Workers' Sports Federation (TUL) Championship series. Due to the 1918 Civil War, Finnish football was divided, TUL and the Finnish Football Association (SPL) had their own leagues and the national team was composed of SPL players only.

Halme represented the TUL football team at the 1928 Summer Spartakiad in Moscow, although the Social Democratic TUL had forbid its athletes to participate the games of the Communist Red Sports International. All athletes who competed at the Spartakiad were dismissed form TUL, and Halme was left without a team.

In 1931, Halme switched to the ″bourgeoisie″ HJK Helsinki, which made him eligible for the national team. Halme debuted for Finland against Sweden in October 1932. In the Finland squad at the 1936 Summer Olympics, Halme was one of the eight former TUL players who had defected to the Finnish Football Association's side.

Club honours 
Finnish Workers' Sports Federation Championship: 1927

References 

1907 births
1981 deaths
Footballers from Helsinki
Association football goalkeepers
Finnish footballers
Finland international footballers
Footballers at the 1936 Summer Olympics
Olympic footballers of Finland
Mestaruussarja players
Helsingin Jalkapalloklubi players
20th-century Finnish people